Levi Richardson (1851 – April 5, 1879) was an Old West gunman, gambler and buffalo hunter. During his lifetime, Richardson was quite well known.

Richardson was born in Wisconsin, migrating to Dodge City, Kansas after first working for a lengthy period as a buffalo hunter. When he first arrived in Dodge City, his reputation as being a gunman came with him, although it was mostly, if not all, hearsay. Richardson no doubt had been involved in several shootouts with Native Americans while on the plains, but as to actual Old West gunfights, no records are known to exist, his only confirmed gunfight being the one in which he was killed.

It is believed that Richardson first arrived in Dodge City around 1874, drifting in and out over time, spending much of his time gambling, and in doing so making that his primary employment. He quickly became well known around the cattle town, and was not particularly well liked, although some sources say he got along well with Bat Masterson. Several around town had known him during his buffalo hunting days, to include Eugene LeCompt and H.H. "Henry" Raymond, who said at best he was an unpleasant man. During this time he met in passing Wyatt Earp and Doc Holliday. He also met and became friends with Frank Loving, a young gambler. 

By all accounts, Loving and Richardson got along well until early 1879, at which time evidently Loving, who had married, believed Richardson was acting inappropriately and disrespectfully toward the latter’s wife, Mattie. This led to problems between the two men, resulting in numerous verbal clashes, and in March, 1879, the two became involved in a fist fight on Front Street. After that fight, Richardson told Loving "I'll blow the guts out of you, you cockeyed son of a bitch", to which Loving, who was not armed at the time, simply turned and walked away. 

The arguments between the two men culminated in Richardson walking into the Long Branch Saloon on April 5, 1879, intent on settling things with Loving once and for all. Loving was not in the saloon at the time, so Richardson waited for him, with Loving appearing some time after 9:00pm. Loving seated himself near a potbellied stove at a long table, at which time Richardson went and joined him. The two, by witness accounts, had a low conversation which no one could hear, then suddenly Richardson stood and said "You wouldn't fight anything, you damn son of a bitch", to which Loving calmly and simply replied "Try me and see". 

Richardson drew his gun first, prompting Loving to do the same, with the two men less than an arms length apart. Richardson fired five rounds to Loving's six, with Richardson grazing Loving's hand, but himself receiving bullet wounds to his chest, side and arm. Deputy Town Marshal Duffy entered the saloon first, disarming Richardson as the latter fell to the floor. Town Marshal Charlie Bassett arrived also, and Loving was arrested, standard procedure in such a case. Richardson died on the floor of the saloon, and the shooting was ruled self defence in a coroners inquest, with no trial. The gunfight, which later became known as the Long Branch Saloon Gunfight, gave notoriety to Loving.

External links
Richardson Gunfighter Summaries - R
Dodge City Gunfight

People from Wisconsin
1851 births
1879 in the United States
People from Dodge City, Kansas
1879 deaths
Bison hunters